Rampal Majra
is an Indian politician and former Indian National Lok Dal MLA from Kalayat, Haryana. He was elected 3 times (1996, 2000, 2009) for member of Haryana Legislative Assembly. He was former Haryana Chief Parliamentary Secretary also.

Personal life 
He was born in Haryana district Kaithal in 1954. He married with Smt. Chameli Devi. They have two children.

Education 
He completed his B.A., LL.B, B.Ed. from Kaithal, Doon College of Law, Sunderpur. He knows Hindi, English, Punjabi and Sanskrit languages.

Political career  
Rampal Majra, a member of the District Bar Association, first became the sarpanch of village Majra in 1978. He became an MLA for the first time in the 1996 elections, contesting the first election from Pai Assembly of Kaithal district on the ticket of Samata Party. He secured 24291 votes and defeated rival Haryana Vikas Party candidate Narsingh Dhanda by a margin of 2275 votes. In the year 2000, Majra defeated Tejendra Pal Mann of Congress by 6596 votes on INLD ticket. In 2005, Tejendra Pal Mann contested as an independent and defeated INLD candidate Rampal Majra by a margin of 6502 votes. After this, the pai Assembly was broken in the delimitation and included in the Pundri and the reserved Kalayat Assembly  was opened. On this, Majra contested the 2009 election on INLD ticket from Kalayat Assembly and became MLA for the third time by defeating rival Tejendrapal Mann by a margin of 9400 votes. Tejendra Pal had contested this election on a Indian National Congress ticket. In the 2014 elections, independent candidate Jai Parkash defeated him by a margin of 8390 votes.  After 40 years of his political career with the Devi lal Family, he finally quits INLD before the Assembly elections of Haryana in 2019 and joined BJP. He resigned from Bhartiya Janta Party on 28 January 2021 in protest of the three farmers bills introduced by Government of India.

References 

Living people
Haryana politicians
Haryana MLAs 2000–2005
Indian National Lok Dal politicians
Haryana MLAs 2009–2014
Haryana MLAs 1996–2000
1954 births